Princess Eugenie Mikhailovna Shakhovskaya (St. Petersburg, Russian Empire), 1889 – Kiev (Ukraine), 1920) (Евгения Михайловна Шаховская, Yevgeniya Mikhaylovna Shakhovskaya) was a Russian Empire pioneering aviator.

She was the first woman to become a military pilot when she flew reconnaissance missions for the Tsar in 1914.

She started taking flying lessons in 1911, and was awarded her flying licence in 1912. However, she gave up flying in 1913 after her instructor died mid-flight.

She was convinced to start flying again and flew reconnaissance missions in World War 1. Eugenie was accused of being a spy, arrested, and sentenced to death. However, she was shown mercy by the Tsar, her cousin, and sentenced to life in prison.

In 1917, during the Russian Revolution, she was freed from prison.

She became the chief executioner for the Cheka. In this time, she also became addicted to drugs. In a narcotic state, she shot one of her assistants and was herself shot dead.

References

External links

Ralph Cooper's EarlyAviators.com

Aviators from the Russian Empire
Nobility from the Russian Empire
Princesses from the Russian Empire
1889 births
1920 deaths
Military personnel from Saint Petersburg
Cheka officers
Soviet executioners